Darren White is a former Sheriff of Bernalillo County, New Mexico, elected in 2002 and re-elected in 2006. Prior to becoming Bernalillo County Sheriff, he was Secretary of the New Mexico Department of Public Safety in Governor Gary Johnson's cabinet. White resigned when Johnson began advocating the legalization of marijuana. White was appointed Chief Public Safety Officer for the City of Albuquerque on December 1, 2009  by the newly elected Albuquerque Mayor Richard J. Berry. He resigned amid controversy involving police shootings and allegations of questionable police procedure in an incident involving a family member.

Biography
Darren White was born in Suffern, New York, in 1963 and moved to New Mexico in 1987. White holds a B.A. in management from the University of Phoenix.

White started his career as a street cop with the Houston Police Department and later joined the Albuquerque Police Department. Before entering law enforcement, White served in the U.S. Army as a clerk in the elite 82nd Airborne Division. As Bernalillo County Sheriff White targeted fugitives from justice, holding regular warrant sweeps, which resulted in hundreds of arrests throughout the year.

Sheriff White's honors include the Jefferson award in 1983 from the coveted American Institute for Public Service. In 2006, following an eight-month search of more than 1,400 business, political, and civic leaders, the Aspen Institute recognized Sheriff White as one of the nation's top 24 young elected officials and selected him for a new fellowship program honoring public leaders. The Aspen Institute identified White as a "true rising star" in American politics.

After stepping down as Secretary of Public Safety, he worked in 1999 as a reporter for KRQE-TV, Channel 13.

White was the Republican candidate for US Congress in New Mexico's 1st congressional district for the 2008 elections, facing Albuquerque city councilman Martin Heinrich. The race was initially considered one of the hottest in the nation due to White's popularity in a Democratic-leaning county. However, in the end, White lost by an 11-point margin. 

In March 2009, White began efforts to reinstate the New Mexico death penalty. The campaign is called Repeal the repeal, which is presently moribund and has come to naught.

In 2010 the mayor of Albuquerque, Richard J. Berry appointed Darren White to oversee the Albuquerque police department as the Chief Public Safety Officer, the highest law enforcement position in the city of Albuquerque. He has since stepped down from this position due to, among other things, startling numbers of controversial police shootings. Also, when his wife caused a traffic accident he went in person to pick her up and deliver her to the hospital so Mrs White was never assessed for intoxication, for another. White denied impropriety and released medical records showing that his wife had had a seizure and had no alcohol or drugs in her system. 
White is currently CEO of The Medical Marijuana Company PurLife.

References

1963 births
Living people
New Mexico sheriffs
New Mexico Republicans
State cabinet secretaries of New Mexico
Houston Police Department officers
Politicians from Albuquerque, New Mexico
People from Suffern, New York